Site of Home of Diego Sepúlveda is an adobe home, built by José Diego Sepúlveda (1820–1869) in 1853. This was the first two-story Monterey-type adobe built in Southern California. It was designated a California Historic Landmark (No. 380) on Jan. 3, 1944. It was located in what is now San Pedro, Los Angeles, California. Nothing remains of the home.

José Diego Sepúlveda was part owner of Rancho San Bernardino. José Diego Sepúlveda married María Francisca Elisalde at Mission San Gabriel Arcángel. Their eldest son was Román Dolores Sepúlveda (1851–1940). José Diego Sepúlveda was the son of José Dolores Sepúlveda (1793–1824) and María Ignacia Marcia Ávila.

See also
California Historical Landmarks in Los Angeles County
List of California Ranchos

References

Adobe buildings and structures in California
Houses completed in 1853
California Historical Landmarks
1853 establishments in California